Roger Federer's 2018 tennis season officially began on 30 December 2017, with the start of the Hopman Cup, and ended on 17 November 2018, with a loss in the semifinals of the ATP Finals. He finished the year ranked No. 3 in the ATP rankings. This season saw Federer improving his career best start to a season at 17–0 (21–0 if including victories at the Hopman Cup). Federer won his twentieth major at the Australian Open and extended his then-record of weeks at World No. 1 to 310 weeks in this season.

Year summary

Early hard court season

Hopman Cup
As in the 2017 edition, Roger Federer paired with Belinda Bencic to represent Switzerland at the Hopman Cup. In the group stage, Federer defeated Yūichi Sugita, Karen Khachanov and Jack Sock, from Japan, Russia and United States respectively, all in straight sets, to help Switzerland advance to the final. They proceeded to defeat Germany 2–1, with Federer beating Alexander Zverev in three sets before the mixed doubles decider, in which he and Bencic defeated the pairing of Zverev and Angelique Kerber. This was Federer's second and Switzerland's third Hopman Cup title overall.

Australian Open

Federer began his participation in the first major tournament of the year by defeating Aljaž Bedene in three sets in the first round. He proceeded to defeat Jan-Lennard Struff, Richard Gasquet, and Márton Fucsovics, all in straight sets, to reach the quarterfinals. There, he faced Tomáš Berdych, defeating him for the ninth straight time in three sets and advancing to the semifinals. With Chung Hyeon retiring mid-match, Federer reached a record 30th major final and his seventh at the Australian Open, before defeating Marin Čilić in a five-set match to win his 20th Grand Slam trophy, extending his own all-time record. This was his sixth Australian Open title, matching the record of Roy Emerson and Novak Djokovic for most tournament wins. At 36 years and 173 days, he became only the third man in the Open Era to win four Grand Slam championship trophies after turning 30 years old. This was the first time since the 2008 US Open when Federer was able to successfully defend a Grand Slam title, and overall marked a historic record 10th Grand Slam title defense.

Rotterdam Open
Federer was given a wild card to play the Rotterdam Open, where he defeated Ruben Bemelmans and Phillip Kohlschreiber in straight sets to advance to the quarterfinals. There, he defeated Robin Haase in three sets, which guaranteed him a return to No. 1 in the ATP rankings the following week. At 36 years and 195 days of age, he surpassed Andre Agassi to become the oldest ATP world No. 1 by more than three years and broke the ATP record for the longest period between two stints at world No. 1 with 5 years and 106 days having elapsed since he last held the No. 1 ranking on 4 November 2012, as well as the record for the longest timespan between the first and most recent dates that he has held the No. 1 ranking: 14 years and 17 days. In the semi-finals, he defeated Andreas Seppi in straight sets before beating Grigor Dimitrov in straight sets in the final to win his second title of the year and his third title in Rotterdam, tying him with Arthur Ashe for most titles at this event. This victory also marked Federer's 97th tour level title and a record 20th ATP Tour 500 level title.

Indian Wells Masters
Federer proceeded to play in the first Masters 1000 tournament of the year, the Indian Wells Masters, knowing that he needed to reach the semifinals in order to keep his world No. 1 ranking. He received a first round bye and was victorious over Federico Delbonis and Filip Krajinović in rounds two and three. He then proceeded to defeat Jérémy Chardy in the fourth round and Chung Hyeon in the quarterfinals to reach the semifinals, thus retaining his world No. 1 ranking. With a close semifinal victory over Borna Ćorić in three sets, Federer compiled a career-best 17–0 start to his season. However, in the final, he fell to Juan Martín del Potro in a close three set match, despite having three match points on his own serve.

Miami Open
Federer entered the Miami Open as the defending champion, knowing that he needed to reach the quarterfinals in order to preserve his world No. 1 ranking. However, after receiving a first round bye, he was upset by Australian qualifier Thanasi Kokkinakis in the second round. At world No. 175, Kokkinakis was the lowest ranked player to defeat a world No. 1 since Francisco Clavet defeated Lleyton Hewitt at the same tournament in 2003. With this loss, he lost the world No. 1 ranking back to Rafael Nadal.

Federer then announced that he would skip the entire clay court season, including the French Open, for the second consecutive year. Despite this, he spent one more week as world No. 1 – the week of 14 May 2018 – as a result of Nadal's quarterfinal loss in the Madrid Open. Nadal went on to regain the ATP rankings' top position the following week, by winning the Italian Open.

Grass court season

Stuttgart Open
Federer returned to the ATP tour to play the Stuttgart Open, which marks the beginning of the grass court season. He entered having won his last 12 matches in a row and 30 sets in a row on grass. After a bye in the first round, he proceeded to defeat Mischa Zverev in three sets to advance to the quarterfinals, ending his streak of 30 consecutive sets won on grass. In the quarterfinals, he defeated Guido Pella in straight sets. He advanced to the final with a three-set victory over Nick Kyrgios, thereby reclaiming the ATP No. 1 ranking from Rafael Nadal in the following week, and defeated Milos Raonic in straight sets to win the Stuttgart Open for the first time and the 98th title of his career. This extended his grass court winning streak to 16.

Halle Open
Federer advanced to the Halle Open, bidding for a tournament-record tenth title. He defeated Aljaž Bedene in straight sets in the first round, setting up a second round match against Benoît Paire which he won in a third set tiebreak after saving two match points. He defeated Matthew Ebden in the quarterfinals and qualifier Denis Kudla in the semifinals, both in straight sets, to reach the final. He faced Borna Ćorić in the final, but lost in three sets despite having a set point in the first set. This loss also meant that he dropped to world No. 2 after one week on top of the rankings. Nevertheless, the match saw an improvement in form from Federer, after a difficult run to the final. This ended a 20 match win streak on grass courts.

Wimbledon

Federer moved on to play the Wimbledon Championships, looking to defend his 2017 title. He was seeded first in a Grand Slam for the first time since the 2012 US Open. During his first-round match, Federer walked onto Centre Court wearing Uniqlo sportswear, officially ending his 20-year relationship with Nike and confirming the rumoured ten-year $300 million contract with the Japanese clothing company. He went on to defeat Dušan Lajović, Lukáš Lacko, Jan-Lennard Struff and Adrian Mannarino, all in straight sets, to reach the quarterfinals. In the quarterfinals, he surprisingly lost to Kevin Anderson in a long five-setter (lasting 4 hours and 14 minutes), with a result of 11–13 in the fifth set, despite having led by two sets to love and having held a match point in the third set, ending a streak of 34 sets won in a row at Wimbledon.

North American hard court season

Cincinnati Masters
On July 23, Federer announced the withdrawal from his previously scheduled Canadian Open, citing his career longevity strategy. This way, he began the North American hard court season in the Cincinnati Masters. He started his campaign by defeating Peter Gojowczyk and Leonardo Mayer in straight sets, setting up a clash with countryman Stan Wawrinka in the quarterfinals. He defeated Wawrinka in three sets, advancing to the semifinals to face David Goffin. Federer won the first set and Goffin was forced to retire in the second set with a shoulder injury. This set up a final between Federer and Novak Djokovic, which Federer lost in straight sets, adding the 46th chapter to their storied rivalry approximately two and a half years after their last meeting.

US Open

Federer moved on to play the US Open, the season's last major, as the No. 2 seed. He did not drop a set in the opening three rounds, defeating Yoshihito Nishioka, Benoît Paire and Nick Kyrgios in the first three rounds. However, Federer proceeded to lose in the fourth round against John Millman in four sets, having missed set points in the second and third sets before losing a fourth-set tiebreak. He committed 77 unforced errors, including 10 double faults, and only hit 49% of first serves in what was widely regarded as one of the worst serving performances of his career. However, Federer assured the number of points needed to qualify for the ATP Finals for the sixteenth time in his career.

Asian swing

Shanghai Masters
Federer started the Asian swing by playing the Shanghai Masters, the eighth Masters 1000 tournament of the season. Due to the absence of his rival Rafael Nadal, the No. 1 player in the ATP rankings, he was the first seed. As a top-eight seed, he earned a first round bye. In the second round, he defeated Daniil Medvedev in three sets, advancing to the third round, where he defeated Roberto Bautista Agut – also in three sets. In the quarterfinals he encountered No. 8 seed Kei Nishikori, defeating him in straight sets and advancing to a semifinal clash with the No. 13 seed, Borna Ćorić. It was their third meeting of the season, with one victory for each in the previous two. Federer ended up losing to Ćorić in straight sets and dropped to No. 3 in the ATP rankings at the following week.

European indoor hard court season

Swiss Indoors
Federer then moved on to play his home tournament, the Swiss Indoors, in Basel, as the defending champion. In an interview, Federer shared that he had sustained a hand injury in training prior to the grass court season that had caused severe pain in his forearm. He stated that this injury significantly hindered his play, particularly his forehand, from the Stuttgart Open until the US Open. In the first two rounds of the tournament, Federer defeated Filip Krajinović and Jan-Lennard Struff, in three and two sets respectively, advancing to the quarterfinals. There, he defeated Gilles Simon in a tough three-set match, reaching his 200th career semifinal. Federer then bested Daniil Medvedev and Marius Copil in straight sets in the semifinal and final respectively, claiming a record-extending ninth Basel title and the 99th title of his career.

Paris Masters
At the beginning of the season, Federer had not expected to play the Paris Masters – the last Masters 1000 tournament of the year. However, he was featured in the draw as the No. 3 seed and later confirmed his presence in the tournament. After getting a bye in the first round, he was supposed to face Milos Raonic in the second round. However, Raonic was forced to withdraw from the tournament due to an elbow injury. Federer then advanced to the third round, where he defeated No. 13 seed Fabio Fognini in straight sets to set a quarterfinal clash with Kei Nishikori. In the quarterfinals he defeated Nishikori, also in straight sets, to set a semifinal match with Novak Djokovic, who was on a 21-match winning streak. In their 47th encounter, Federer lost to the red-hot Serb in three very close sets, despite having a set point in the first set.

ATP Finals

Having qualified for the ATP Finals, Federer was drawn in the group Lleyton Hewitt with Kevin Anderson, Dominic Thiem and Kei Nishikori. In his first match, he lost in straight sets to Nishikori for his ninth defeat of the season. He then defeated Thiem and Anderson, both in straight sets, to ultimately win the group and secure a semifinal place in the tournament. However, in his fifteenth tournament semifinal, Federer lost in straight sets to eventual champion Alexander Zverev to finish the season.

All matches
This table chronicles all the matches of Roger Federer in 2018, including walkovers (W/O) which the ATP does not count as wins.

Singles matches

Doubles matches

Hopman Cup matches

Singles

Mixed doubles

Exhibition matches

Singles

Doubles

Schedule

Singles schedule

Doubles schedule

Yearly records

Head-to-head matchups

ATP and Grand Slam sanctioned matches
Roger Federer has a  ATP match win–loss record in the 2018 season. Bold indicates player was ranked top 10 at time of at least one meeting. The following list is ordered by number of wins: 

  Nick Kyrgios 3–0
  Jan-Lennard Struff 3–0
  Aljaž Bedene 2–0
  Chung Hyeon 2–0 
  Filip Krajinović 2–0
  Daniil Medvedev 2–0
  Benoît Paire 2–0
  Kei Nishikori 2–1
  Roberto Bautista Agut 1–0
  Ruben Bemelmans 1–0
  Tomáš Berdych 1–0
  Jérémy Chardy 1–0
  Marius Copil 1–0
  Marin Čilić 1–0
  Federico Delbonis 1–0
  Grigor Dimitrov 1–0
  Matthew Ebden 1–0
  Fabio Fognini 1–0
  Márton Fucsovics 1–0
  Richard Gasquet 1–0
  David Goffin 1–0
  Peter Gojowczyk 1–0
  Robin Haase 1–0
  John Isner 1–0
  Philipp Kohlschreiber 1–0
  Denis Kudla 1–0
  Lukáš Lacko 1–0
  Dušan Lajović 1–0
  Adrian Mannarino 1–0
  Leonardo Mayer 1–0
  Yoshihito Nishioka 1–0
  Guido Pella 1–0
  Milos Raonic 1–0
  Andreas Seppi 1–0
  Gilles Simon 1–0
  Dominic Thiem 1–0
  Stan Wawrinka 1–0
  Mischa Zverev 1–0
  Kevin Anderson 1–1
  Borna Ćorić 1–2
  Juan Martín del Potro 0–1
  Thanasi Kokkinakis 0–1
  John Millman 0–1 
  Alexander Zverev 0–1
  Novak Djokovic 0–2

ITF sanctioned matches
While these are official sanctioned matches per the ITF, the ATP does not count them in their totals. Bold indicates player was ranked top 10 at time of at least one meeting. The extra ITF matches are as follows:
  Karen Khachanov 1–0
  Jack Sock 1–0
  Yūichi Sugita 1–0
  Alexander Zverev 1–0

Finals

Singles: 7 (4 titles, 3 runner-ups)

Team competitions: 2 (2 titles)

Earnings
Bold font denotes tournament win

 Figures in United States dollars (USD) unless noted.

Awards
ATPWorldTour.com Fans' Favourite
Record sixteenth consecutive award in career

See also
 2018 ATP World Tour
 2018 Rafael Nadal tennis season
 2018 Novak Djokovic tennis season
 2018 Juan Martín del Potro tennis season

References

External links
  
 ATP tour profile

Roger Federer tennis seasons
Federer
2018 in Swiss tennis
2018 in Swiss sport